Chris Cornell is a posthumous compilation album by American musician Chris Cornell, released on November 16, 2018. It compiles his solo work, as well as his work with his bands Soundgarden, Temple of the Dog, and Audioslave, and includes a new song titled "When Bad Does Good". The album was released in a variety of versions, including standard and deluxe versions in both digital (download and streaming) and physical formats (CD and vinyl), and a super deluxe box set that includes a total of 64 tracks, including 10 unreleased songs. Cornell's "When Bad Does Good" won a Grammy award in the Best Rock Performance category at the 61st Grammy Awards in 2019, and the album's package won a Grammy for Best Packaging at the 62nd Grammy Awards in 2020.

Background
In a statement, Cornell's wife Vicky said that she felt "we needed to create a special collection to represent all of him – the friend, husband and father, the risk taker and innovator, the poet and artist. His soaring vocals found their way into the hearts and souls of so many. His voice was his vision and his words were his peace. This album is for his fans." Many of Cornell's friends contributed to the album; including being produced by Brendan O'Brien, with Jeff Ament of Pearl Jam creating the artwork.

Artwork
The album's artwork was designed by Jeff Ament, his brother Barry Ament, and creative director Joe Spix. It won a Grammy Award for Best Recording Package in 2020. Jeff Ament told Variety in the Grammy's press room about working on the package:

It was super emotional because we first got the call only five or six weeks after he passed. It felt too soon at that point to be thinking about that. It took us a few months to come up with some images, and it was particularly hard to have conversations with Vicky, his wife. More than anything, I wish he were here accepting this award with us."

Critical reception

Everett True of Classic Rock rated the album four stars out of five, acclaiming Cornell's "killer acoustic versions", including Michael Jackson's "Billie Jean", which he called "throbbing with restrained power", but called his covers of John Lennon's "Imagine" and the Beatles' "A Day in the Life" "ill-advised", as well as "mawkish" and a "perfunctory run-through", respectively. True felt that while "a majority of this collection is given over to Soundgarden", it is still "Cornell's voice that wins through – a star-burst of a scream, a full-throated delight."

Track listing

Standard edition

Deluxe edition

Charts

References

2018 compilation albums
Chris Cornell albums
Compilation albums published posthumously